, also known as , is a Japanese light novel series written by Tarō Tatsunoko and illustrated by Yū Amano. An anime adaptation by Diomedéa aired from January 11, 2013, to March 15, 2013. Part 1 of the series ended on April 1, 2015, with twelve volumes total with Part 2 beginning on June 1, 2015, under the new title  and a new illustrator, momoco.

Plot
Three children, Sakamaki Izayoi, Kudō Asuka, and Kasukabe Yō, live dull lives because they possess unmatched psychic powers. One day, they receive an envelope that transports them to Little Garden, a place of supernatural powers called "Gifts." There, the residents use Gifts to play high-stakes games known as Gift Games so as to earn wealth and prestige for their communities. So, the three children join the fallen "No Name" community and resolve to help it regain its prosperity. As they learn more about Little Garden, they decide to overthrow the tyrannical Demon Lords.

Characters

Main

An arrogant boy who often tries to solve problems with violence, yet he is also incredibly intelligent. He was bored of his old world and is currently searching for anything fun in the Little Garden. His gift is "Code: Unknown," according to the "Gift Card", a "Fragment of Laplace," which cannot figure out his ability. His natural ability is the power to negate and destroy other gifts. Izayoi is also an expert on mythology thanks to his adopted mother, and he is a genius tactician and analyst. In volume 3, it is revealed that Izayoi's adopted mother is the former strategist of the "No Names", and his powers are that he is able to destroy stars. Summoned from an unnamed year in the 2010s, his most important goal is "having fun."

A rabbit-eared girl who resides in the Little Garden and is the one who summoned the problem children. She often tries to be serious but easily gets flustered. When using her power, her blue hair turns pink as she gains increased power. This also happens at other times, such as when Izayoi promised his aid to her community or when enjoying a bath with the girls. One of Black Rabbit's gifts is the "Spear of Indra", a powerful legendary weapon that allows her to control lightning. She also has enormous leg strength and speed equaling Izayoi's. She is also a victim to the pervertedness of Izayoi and Shiroyasha.

A rich young lady who has the Gift "Authority", use her authority to command others with her words. It also has the ability to control other gifts and strengthen an object's power as long as the power of the object is weaker than the power of her gift. She owns another Gift called Dean, a massive giant Golem. Summoned from an unnamed year right after World War II, her most important goal is "understanding others."

A quiet young girl whose gift, which is called "Genome Tree - Non Priorum", was a pendant given to her by her father. It bestows her the ability to speak to animals and use the abilities of any animal she is able to befriend. She is often accompanied by a calico cat who is the first animal she befriends with her power, which allowed her to be able to walk again, after being crippled in a hospital. Summoned from an unnamed year in the distant future, her most important goal is "making friends."

Others

The current leader of the community "No Name". He is the oldest of the children in the community.

A senior official at Thousand Eyes, Floor Master on the East Side, Demon Lord of the White Night, spirit of the sun and white night. Her headquarters are located in 4-digit gate number #3345. She has blue-white hair, cat-like yellow eyes, and is small of stature. She dresses in a yukata and is also quite perverted. Her control of the sun allows her to create heat blasts up to 7000 degrees Celsius.

One of the members of the community "No Name". She is a young anthropomorphic fox. It's later revealed that her mother was sent to a Gift Game and she never came back.

A former member of "No Name". She was a Vampire Lord whose title was stripped upon being turned into a slave following her community's fall. She later regains her powers, but agrees to work as a maid for the community. Even as a maid she helps protect the community. Although she is usually seen her "loli form", she also has a more mature form that can be seen when she is using more advanced magic.

One of the floor masters, she is a young girl who is a friend of Jin and Riri. She has dragonoid features and can use fire in her attacks.

Unofficial Demon Lord and Leader of Grim Grimoire Hamlin. She is the embodiment of the 80 million evil spirits that were created during the Black Plague. She later becomes one of Jin's summons.

Media

Light novels
Part 1

Part 2

Manga
Mondaiji-tach ga isekai kara kuru sou desu yo? is a seinen manga series that began serialization in Comp Ace with Nanamomo Rio as the illustrator. Covering volumes 1 and 2 of the light novel and ran alongside the anime, though outlasting it as the eighteen chapters were released once a month. The manga is more faithful to the light novel and has scenes the anime does not. 

Mondaiji-tachi ga isekai kara kuru sou desu yo? Z is a shonen spin off manga written and illustrated by Anri Sakano. It ran in Age Premium during the run of the anime and after it. Volumes 1 and 2 take place after the events of volume 2 of the light novel, and by extension the anime, while volume 3 takes place after volume 5.

Anime
An anime television adaptation produced by Diomedéa aired on Tokyo MX from January 11, 2013, to March 15, 2013, and later on other stations. The series was simulcast by Crunchyroll and Anime on Demand. The opening theme is "Black † White" by Iori Nomizu whilst the ending theme is "To Be Continued?" by Kaori Sadohara. In 2015, it aired on Anime Network On Demand on DIRECTV with English subtitles.

Episode list

References

External links
Official light novel website 
Last Embryo light novel website 
Official anime website 

2011 Japanese novels
2012 manga
2013 Japanese television series endings
2013 anime television series debuts
Action anime and manga
Anime and manga based on light novels
Comedy anime and manga
Diomedéa
Fujimi Shobo manga
Isekai anime and manga
Isekai novels and light novels
Kadokawa Dwango franchises
Kadokawa Shoten manga
Kadokawa Sneaker Bunko
Light novels
Seinen manga
Sentai Filmworks
Shōnen manga
Television shows based on light novels
Tokyo MX original programming